The Volkswagen Challenger was a professional tennis tournament played on indoor carpet courts. It was  part of the ATP Challenger Tour. It was held annually at the Tennisclub Grün-Gold Wolfsburg in Wolfsburg, Germany, between 1993 and 2012.

Many players won two titles, Axel Pretzsch Ruben Bemelmans in singles Robert Lindstedt, Jean-Claude Scherrer and Martin Sinner in doubles. But only Axel Pretzsch won both titles simultaneously.

Past finals

Singles

Doubles

External links
Official website

 
Volkswagen Challenger
Volkswagen Challenger
Volkswagen Challenger
Volkswagen Challenger
Volkswagen Challenger
Volkswagen Challenger
Defunct tennis tournaments in Germany